The black nudibranch (Tambja capensis) is a species of colorful sea slug, a dorid nudibranch, a shell-less marine gastropod mollusk in the family Polyceridae. This species is endemic to South Africa.

Distribution
This species is endemic to the South African coast, being found from the Atlantic coast of the Cape Peninsula to Port Elizabeth from the shallow subtidal to at least 30 m.

Description
The black nudibranch is a large (up to 80 mm) deep-bodied nudibranch. It is easily recognised because of its blue-black colour and bright turquoise marginal line. Some specimens are brownish with a purple marginal line. Its gills and rhinophores are black.

Ecology
The black nudibranch feeds on tree-like bryozoans. Its egg ribbon is a bright yellow rose-like spiral.

References

Polyceridae
Molluscs of the Atlantic Ocean
Molluscs of the Indian Ocean
Endemic fauna of South Africa
Gastropods described in 1907